Elections to Allerdale Borough Council were held on 6 May 1999.  The whole council was up for election with boundary changes since the last election in 1995 increasing the number of seats by 3.  The Labour party kept overall control of the council.  The election for Moorclose ward was postponed until 1 July meaning 3 seats were vacant, see Allerdale local elections for the results.

Results

11 Labour and 1 Liberal Democrat candidates were uncontested.

Ward results

External links
BBC report of 1999 Allerdale election results BBC News

1999 English local elections
1999
1990s in Cumbria
May 1999 events in the United Kingdom